MGH may refer to:

 Bad Mergentheim (vehicle registration plate), Germany
 Margate Airport (IATA code), South Africa
 Massachusetts General Hospital, Boston, US
 Charles/MGH station, near Massachusetts General Hospital
Medical-Grade Honey, refers to honey that has been sterilised by gamma radiation, provides an indicator of the level of the honey’s antibacterial activity, is registered for medical purposes and meets national requirements for medical product labelling. Medical-grade honey can be used as an ointment or gel, or impregnated into wound dressings.
 Montreal General Hospital, Canada
 Michael Garron Hospital, Toronto, Canada
 Monumenta Germaniae Historica, a series of German history primary sources
 Microglandular hyperplasia, a cervical lesion

References